Travancore flying squirrel (Petinomys fuscocapillus), also known as the small flying squirrel, is a flying squirrel found in South India and Sri Lanka. Travancore flying squirrels were thought to be extinct but were rediscovered in 1989 after a gap of 100 years in Kerala. It was rediscovered in Sri Lanka after 78 years. The animals were reported only in wet and intermediate zones of the island, and had a few sightings in the Sinharaja Forest Reserve.

Description
Head and body length is 32 cm. Tail is 25–29 cm. 
Dorsally reddish brown. Underparts grayish with a ruddy tinge. Tail is feather-shaped and reddish brown with a blackish undersurface. Membrane behind hind limb is small. Vibrissae is black. Dorsal fur is very soft, long and sheen.

Subspecies
There are 2 subspecies, as;
 Petinomys fuscocapillus fuscocapillus (Jerdon, 1847) - Western Ghats of Peninsular India
 Petinomys fuscocapillus layardi (Kelaart, 1850) - Sri Lanka.

Ecology
Rare, nocturnal mammal with frugivorous diet, they are known to eat bark, shoots, and leaves, and even insects also.

References

Ananthakrishnan G. (3/12/2006) Squirrels in focus, the Hindu, retrieved 6/13/2007 Two flying squirrel species
http://www.researchgate.net/publication/237099131_The_small_flying_squirrel_(Petinomys_fuscocapillus)_observed_after_78_years_in_Sri_Lanka
http://www.manoramaonline.com/cgi-bin/mmonline.dll/portal/localContentView.do?tabId=16&programId=1079897624&contentId=13866795&district=Cochin&BV_ID=@@@

Petinomys
Mammals of Asia
Rodents of India
Mammals of Sri Lanka
Mammals described in 1847